Devilance the Pursuer is a fictional extraterrestrial hunter in the DC Comics universe.

Publication history
Devilance first appeared in Forever People #11 (August 1972) and was created by Jack Kirby.

Fictional character biography
Devilance the Pursuer was once one of the most respected minions of Darkseid, lord of Apokolips, as the hunter who captured and brought back his prey to his master for many years. Devilance was tapped to track and destroy Darkseid's hated rivals, the Forever People. When he found them on an island in the Pacific Ocean, the Forever People switched places with the Infinity Man. Devilance and Infinity Man engaged in a terrible battle that destroyed the small island they were fighting on. Both of them appeared atomized and were presumed dead, although later Infinity Man returned to assist the Forever People again. Devilance was not seen for years.

Devilance resurfaces in DC's weekly comic series 52, where he is substantially larger than he was portrayed in the past. He is on a remote alien planet where Starfire, Adam Strange and Animal Man are stranded. It is revealed that Devilance has captured Starfire. Adam Strange and Animal Man search for her but fall victim to his traps and are also captured.

Three days and two nights by in-story time, Devilance seems to believe the trio saw something only the gods (such as himself) were meant to. Thus, being "The God of the Pursuit", Devilance took it upon himself to catch them. The team manage to burn Devilance's face and escape his clutches. They also steal his lance in hopes of using it as a power source for their space cruiser. Devilance is last seen bound by the very vines that once held his captives. It is also of note that, as Starfire stated during her escape, the whole planet they are on seems to be a trap set by Devilance himself.

He catches up with their spaceship only to be killed by Lobo.

In 2016, DC Comics implemented another relaunch of its books called "DC Rebirth", which restored its continuity to a form much as it was prior to "The New 52". In the pages of Dial H for Hero, Devilance was seen with DeSaad, Kalibak, Tigra, Steppenwolf, and the Parademons when Robby Reed's Mister Thunderbolt side used the Y-Dial to split Miguel Montez into the Reign of the Supermiguels during their raid on Apokolips.

Powers and abilities
Devilance the Pursuer has superhuman strength and a high degree of immunity to physical injury. Possibly much of his strength and resistance to injury is due to his ability to increase his own physical density. Devilance also has many undefined powers that enable his body to adjust to and undo the effects of various kinds of weaponry or super powers used against him. For example, his body can adjust to extreme temperatures.

Equipment
Devilance's principal weapon is his lance, which serves many functions. It can fire powerful energy blasts. It enables Devilance to fly by holding onto it. It contains circuitry enabling him to track down his victims. Other circuitry causes his lance to return to him if he is separated from it. Devilance can cause his lance's blade to glow with destructive energy. He can also mentally command the lance to leap onto an adversary and tightly coil itself about him.

References

External links
 Devilance at DC Comics Wiki
 Devilance at the Unofficial Guide to the DC Universe

New Gods of Apokolips
Comics characters introduced in 1972
Characters created by Jack Kirby
DC Comics aliens
DC Comics characters with superhuman strength
DC Comics deities
DC Comics demons
DC Comics extraterrestrial supervillains
Fictional hunters